This is the discography of Scottish soft rock band Wet Wet Wet.

Albums

Studio albums

Compilation albums

Live albums

Other albums

Singles

Promotional singles

References

Discographies of British artists
Pop music group discographies